Bait Bakhtiari is a small village in the Punjab province of Pakistan,  from Uch Sharif, Bahawalpur.

Bait Bakhtiari is located in the Ahmedpur East Tehsil in Bahawalpur District. It is a rural area with an estimated population of 5000. People earn their living through agriculture. It is also the main source for fulfilling the food requirements for the inhabitants of the village.

The people of Bait Bakhtiari speak the Saraiki language.

Development
Electricity is available in all almost houses there. There is, however, no gas facility yet.

Ghreeb shah Mosque (Masjid) is the only Mosque (Masjid) for Jummah and Eid prayers.
Every year this area becomes the victim of flooding. Every year flood wreaks havoc due to a week dam which breaks down every year, causing a lot of damage and destruction. The government has tried to manage the problem, but proper arrangements to save the area have yet to be taken. In 2014, the government distributed approximately 1.5 lakh to every victim's family.
There is no agricultural machinery and the people of this area still use traditional methods; agriculture is the primary source of their income.

References 

Villages in Bahawalpur District